Bjarni Halldórsson (c. 1703 – 1773) was an Icelandic legal figure and theologian. He is best known for being a county magistrate. He first lived in Víðidalstungu but most of his life he lived in Þingeyrar.

References
Jón Espólín: Íslands Árbækur í sögu-formi. X. deild, prentað á kostnað ens íslenzka Bókmenntafélags, Kaupmannahöfn 1848. Blaðsíða 34. (Ljósprentuð 2. útgáfa 1947.)

18th-century Icelandic judges
Icelandic theologians
1703 births
1773 deaths